Karl Ammitzböll (22 August 1915 – 5 December 1985) was a Danish equestrian. He competed in two events at the 1956 Summer Olympics.

References

External links
 

1915 births
1985 deaths
Danish male equestrians
Olympic equestrians of Denmark
Equestrians at the 1956 Summer Olympics
People from Frederikssund Municipality
Sportspeople from the Capital Region of Denmark